The Fiber Optic Sensing Association (FOSA) is a nonprofit industry association that promotes fiber-optic sensing technology. It was founded in April 2017 in Washington, D.C. and has a membership of 24 companies and universities.

Background and structure
The Fiber Optic Sensing Association was founded on April 24, 2017. It had nearly a dozen founding member companies representing an "eclectic" group, including Corning Inc. and OFS, across the United States, Japan, the United Kingdom, and Switzerland. The agenda for the first meeting of FOSA focused on promoting fiber-optic sensing technology through infrastructure priorities including smart highways and implementation into larger construction projects.

FOSA is affiliated with the Fiber Broadband Association (FBA), which promotes fiber-optic networking technology. Its current Chairman is Dave Cunningham of Network Integrity Solutions.

Research
A December 2017 study from FOSA found that China had the most distributed fiber-optic sensing installations in the world, followed by Germany, the United States, and South Korea.
In August 2018, the organization launched a report advocating the use of fiber-optic sensing technology in railways to improve security. It has also supported implementation of fiber-optic sensing technology in the pipeline industry to monitor leaks, tampering, and hazardous conditions.

FOSA supported the Smart Cities and Communities Act, introduced by Representatives Suzan DelBene and Yvette Clarke. The bill would provide $1.1 billion to expand the use of smart city technology.

Members
As of June 2022, FOSA claims 22 members:
AP Sensing
Corning Inc.
Ditch Witch
Dura-Line Corporation
FEBUS Optics
Fotech Solutions
Hifi Engineering
Institute of Engineering Geodesy and Measurement Systems, Graz University of Technology
LIOS Technology
NBG Fiber Optic Corp.
NEC Corporation of America
Network Integrity Systems
OFS
Omnisens
OptaSense
OZ Optics
Prysmian Group
Sensonic
Senstar Corporation
Smartpipe Technologies
University of California, Berkeley
Viavi_Solutions

References

External links
Official website

Fiber optics
Organizations established in 2017
Telecommunications organizations